Almanach is an album by Malicorne, released in 1976 on  the Grffin label. As before, it has a complex sound. The arrival of Hughes de Courson has given the album a more classical feel.

Track listing 
All songs traditional except where noted.

 "Salut à la compagnie" – 0:55 
 "Quand j'étais chez mon père" – 3:44
 "Margot" (Gabriel Yacoub) – 0:58
 "Les tristes noces" – 7:44
 "Voici venir le joli mai" – 0:24
 "Voici la Saint Jean (ronde)" – 3:13
 "Le luneux" – 5:03 
 "Branle de la haie" (Trad., Malicorne) – 2:08 
 "Quand je menai mes chevaux boire" – 4:39 
 "La  fille au cresson" – 3:40
 "L'écolier assassin" – 8:38 
 "Noël est arrivé" – 2:03
 "La fiancée du timbalier" (lyrics: Victor Hugo; music: Trad.) – 5:45

Personnel 

Gabriel Yacoub – acoustic and electric guitar, mandolin, vocals)
Marie Yacoub – electric dulcimer, bouzouki, hurdy-gurdy, Epinette des Vosges, psaltery, vocals)
Laurent Vercambre – violin, cello, keyboards, mandolin, vocals)
Hughes de Courson – bass, crumhorn, flute a bec, percussion, vocals)
Oliver Zdrzalik – bass, keyboards, vocals 
"La Bamboche" on "Les Tristes Noces" – guest group

References

Malicorne (band) albums
1976 albums